Raz Shlomo (born 13 August 1999) is an Israeli professional footballer who plays as a fullback for Maccabi Netanya. He has played for Israel at various levels.

Early life
Shlomo grew up in Ashkelon, Israel, to a Jewish family.

References

External links

1989 births
Living people
Israeli Jews
Israeli footballers
Association football defenders
Israel youth international footballers
Israel under-21 international footballers
Israel international footballers
Hapoel Tel Aviv F.C. players
Maccabi Netanya F.C. players
Liga Leumit players
Israeli Premier League players
Footballers from Ashkelon